WWDN (1580 AM) is a classic hits broadcast radio station licensed to Danville, Virginia, serving Danville, Virginia and Yanceyville, North Carolina.  WWDN is owned and operated by Lakes Media LLC.

History
Neill McMillan (father of Neill McMillan Jr., aka Mojo Nixon), described as "a 'champion' of the black community," bought then WILA in 1969 from Ralph Baron and George Lund, who were the first owners of the station to target African-American listeners. Despite graffiti and tire damage, McMillan was committed to the Civil Rights Movement and aired speeches by Martin Luther King Jr. both times the civil rights leader visited Danville. WILA's call-letters were originally from a defunct radio station in Woodstock, Illinois which broadcast from 1948 until 1950. After McMillan's death in 1978, his wife Frances ran the station, later selling to Lawrence and Ella Toller's Tol-Tol Communications. Lawrence Toller managed WILA for 17 years, although he lived in Lynchburg.

The station's format was urban oldies/black gospel "Heart and Soul".

Station sold
On August 19, 2009, WILA was sold to Birch Broadcasting Corporation for $150,000. Toller said, "It has been an outlet for the black community. They may not have that now and I’m sorry about that." The station added an FM translator and changed format to classic hits WWDN as "104-5 the Dan" on December 14, 2009, debuting with 10,000 songs in a row (commercial-free) by such artists as Fleetwood Mac, The Eagles, Elton John and Journey.

Translator
In addition to the main station, WWDN is relayed by an FM translator to widen its broadcast area.

References

External links
104.5 The Dan Online

WDN
Radio stations established in 1957
Classic hits radio stations in the United States
1957 establishments in Virginia
WDN